Onkar Nath Srivastava (31 December 1942 – 24 April 2021) was an Indian material physicist, an Emeritus professor of Banaras Hindu University and the vice president for India and South Asia of the International Association for Hydrogen Energy, who was known for his contributions to the disciplines of nanotechnology and hydrogen energy. He was the author of two books and over 440 scientific papers and a recipient of several honors including Shanti Swarup Bhatnagar Prize, the highest Indian award in the science and technology categories. The Government of India awarded him the fourth highest civilian honour of the Padma Shri, in 2016, for his contributions to science and engineering.

Biography 
Srivastava was born on 31 December 1942, in Varanasi, the holy city of Lord Shiva in the Indian state of Uttar Pradesh. He secured his master's degree in Physics (MSc) in 1961 from Banaras Hindu University (BHU) and followed it up with a doctoral degree (PhD) from the same institution, under the guidance of renowned physicist Ajit Ram Verma, in 1966. After doing his post doctoral research at Cornell University, USA, he returned to India to start his career as a lecturer at Banaras Hindu University where he served in different capacities as that of a reader, professor, head of the department of physics and the coordinator of the Centre of Advance Studies-Hydrogen Energy Centre. After his superannuation from service, he continues his association with the university as a professor emeritus and as an associate faculty member of Condensed Matter Experiment research program of the university.

Srivastava, a former member of the board of directors of The World Academy of Sciences,. was the vice president (India & South Asia) of the International Association of Hydrogen Energy, having been elected to the position in 2012, where he also serves as a member of their editorial board. Under his guidance, the Hydrogen Energy Centre of BHU was involved in advance research on the practical applications of hydrogen fuel, in association with the Ministry of New and Renewable Energy and the Department of Science and Technology (DST), of the Government of India. He published two books, Crystallography Applied to Solid State Physics and Formation and phase stability of Al based quasicrystals: Quasicrystal and over 440 scientific papers. He delivered keynote addresses in a number of science seminars and undertook several projects for various government agencies; Nanoscience and Technology of the Department of Science and Technology (2005–2010), Support to Hydrogen Energy Centre (2007–2012), Development & Demonstration of Hydrogen Catalytic Combustion Cookers (2007–2010), Development & Demonstration of Hydrogen Fueled three wheelers (2009–2012), Mission Mode Project on Hydrogen Storage Materials (Hydride) (2009–2014), all of the Ministry of New and Renewable Energy, and Synthesis Characterization and Properties of Single Walled Carbon Nanotubes (2009–2012) of the Defence Research and Development Organization are some of the notable ones. He was also involved in organizing science conferences and mentored 87 doctoral students.

Srivastava died from COVID-19 in April 2021.

Books

Awards and honors 

In 1988, The Council of Scientific and Industrial Research (CSIR) awarded Srivastava the Shanti Swarup Bhatnagar Prize, the highest Indian science award for his contributions on high temperature oxide superconductors, growth, characterization and application of hydrogen storage materials. He received the Goyal Prize in Physical Sciences and K. S. Rao Memorial Award on Renewable Energy in 2000 and two years later, the Indian Science Congress Association awarded him the 2002 Homi J. Bhabha Award in Applied Sciences. In 2009, he was recognized by the ICSC with the Material Research Society of India-ICSC Award. The National Academy of Sciences, India elected him as their fellow in 1989, followed by the Indian National Science Academy in 1994 and the International Association of Hydrogen Energy in 2010. He was also an elected fellow of the Asia Pacific Academy of Materials, International Academy of Physical Sciences and the New York Academy of Sciences.

See also 
 Ajit Ram Verma
 Nanotechnology
 List of Banaras Hindu University people

References

External links 
 

1942 births
2021 deaths
Recipients of the Padma Shri in science & engineering
Indian materials scientists
20th-century Indian physicists
Recipients of the Shanti Swarup Bhatnagar Award in Physical Science
Banaras Hindu University alumni
Academic staff of Banaras Hindu University
Fellows of the Indian National Science Academy
Fellows of The National Academy of Sciences, India
Indian technology writers
Cornell University alumni
Scientists from Varanasi
Indian scientific authors
Deaths from the COVID-19 pandemic in India